The Chrysler E platform referred to two separate and unrelated car ranges. 

The "E" designation was initially used for the following rear wheel drive cars in the 1970s:
 1970-1974 Dodge Challenger,  wheelbase
 1970-1974 Plymouth Barracuda,  wheelbase

The designation was later used for an extended version (hence "E") of the front wheel drive Chrysler K platform during the 1980s for the following cars:
 1983-1988 Dodge 600
 1985-1988 Plymouth Caravelle
 1983-1984 Chrysler E-Class
 1983-1987 Chrysler New Yorker
 1988 Chrysler New Yorker Turbo
 1983-1986 Chrysler Executive

See also
 Chrysler platforms

E